Dyab Abou Jahjah (born 24 June 1971 in Hanin, Lebanon) is an Arab political activist and writer who was active in Europe between 2001 and 2007. He is the founder and former leader of the Arab European League (AEL), a Pan-Arabist movement that supports the interests of Muslim immigrants in Europe. Since then, Abou Jahjah has distanced himself from identity politics and holds a non-ethnic, secular, and leftist framework.

Personal life

He was born and grew up in southern Lebanon in Hanin, near the Lebanese-Israeli border. He gained refugee status in 1996 and became a Belgian citizen through marriage to a Belgian woman, from whom he much later divorced. He is now married to a Belgian Muslim woman, Nabila Boujdaine of Moroccan origin, who was also on the electoral lists for his MDP party in 2004. N. Boujdaine is the sister of Saida from the book Saida, written by De Standaard journalist, Tom Naegels and is the partner in a new organisation, Safe Have Aid,  established by Dyab Abou Jahjah and his brother. He holds a Master's degree in political science from the Université catholique de Louvain.

Abou Jahjah has written several books, among them an autobiography entitled "Between Two Worlds - the Roots of a Freedom Fight" that sold 7,000 copies in Belgium and the Netherlands. He was also the subject of two political biographies, one written by Mohammed Benzakour and the other by Maroun Labaki, and a political analysis book written by the Belgian communist writer Ludo De Witte.

Move to Belgium
In 1991, at the age of 19, Abou Jahjah left Lebanon: "I wanted to go abroad like a lot of Lebanese young people". Abou Jahjah studied at Université catholique de Louvain (UCL) in Louvain la Neuve and obtained a master's degree in  political science and International relations. After several odd jobs during his study time, including factory work and construction labour, he became the director of vzw Welkom, the Immigrant working body for the Belgian ABVV trade Union.

Political views

Abou Jahjah is a Social democrat and moderate Muslim, although he later revealed that he is rather a Muslim by culture and agnostic on faith. He is an opponent of assimilation. He believes immigrants should be treated as full citizens who can keep their own culture, rather than being treated as guests. He was compared to the American activist Malcolm X, also a Muslim, who opposed assimilation and the melting pot model of integration.  He sees the integration of Armenians in Lebanon as the ideal model. He has said that, "America's race laws are more advanced than here. I have relatives in Detroit and they are Arab-Americans but they feel American. I don't feel European. Europe needs to make its concept of citizenship inclusive to all cultures and religions.

Arab European League

In 2000 Abou Jahjah founded the Arab European League in Antwerp, a city with a large Muslim population. In the 2003 election the Arab European League partnered with the Marxist-Leninist Workers' Party of Belgium to form the RESIST (electoral list), which failed to win any seats and soon dissolved. 
In 2004 he started the MDP, but this party didn't obtain any elected participants. Early in 2006 Abou Jahjah announced that he will no longer be leading the AEL nor holding a leadership position.

Sabra and Shatila

In 2001, Abou Jahjah founded the Sabra and Shatila committee, which brought a lawsuit against former Israeli Prime Minister Ariel Sharon for his alleged role in the Sabra and Shatila massacre committed, in adjacent refugee camps, during the Israel-Lebanon war in 1982.

9/11

He said of Arab reaction to the 11 September 2001 terrorist attacks that "Most of us ... felt that day something that can not be described as joy, or as happiness, but rather as that sweet revenge feeling. We all had – except that small minority- a "what goes around comes around’" attitude", but he continued that "Now, almost two months after the eleventh of September, we see things clear(er). It is terrible how criminals can cause by their acts the misery for so many people, people of their own kind and people of their alleged enemy. How violence will breed violence that will breed more violence".

Negative attitudes towards homosexuals
In his own column in the Belgian daily De Standaard, he stated "We (Belgians with Arab roots) are predominantly negatively disposed towards homosexuals. This isn't because we're immigrants, but rather because we're men. The idea that another man could desire us sexually, is for most heterosexual men a nightmare that can render them aggressive."

Means to an end
Abou Jahjah considers democracy a strong means to an end. Sharia would be instated after a democratic process. Indeed, his messages are altogether mixed  Jahjah suggested in a televised debate that a similar attack was likely in the Netherlands. "It's logical," he said. "You make war with us, we make war with you."

Controversies

Arrest

Abou Jahjah was arrested and detained for several days in 2002 after he allegedly organized riots and called for violence. The riots broke out in Borgerhout, a district of Antwerp, after a 27-year-old Belgian-Moroccan was shot by his Flemish neighbor. He was acquitted from all charges on October 21, 2008. A police officer who was watching him the night of the riots said that Abou Jahjah is innocent and that the evidence against him was fabricated. His arrest sparked sharp debates and dominated Belgian politics for months. He gained a lot of support among Belgian intellectuals and academics and was considered as a political prisoner. 300 personalities signed a petition demanding a more moderate approach by the government in dealing with the AEL and the issue of immigration and discrimination in the country. The case became a famous example of demonization of political activists and violation of the separation of powers. The Abou Jahjah affaire is still taught as a case study in some law schools in Belgium and the Netherlands.

Theo van Gogh

In the Netherlands, Abou Jahjah had a row with the late film director Theo van Gogh, who was known for his opposition to Islam. After van Gogh, who was supposed to be the moderator of a debate between him and Boris Dittrich, insulted Abou Jahjah by calling him "de pooier van de profeet" ("the prophet's pimp") in front of an audience of 1000 people, Abou Jahjah stormed out of the theater, with his bodyguards in tow and refused to continue considering that a moderator should be neutral and not insult the guests. His opponent that day Boris Dietrich declared his sympathy to his position and his dismay at the behavior of Van Gogh.

2006 Israel-Lebanon war

In July 2006 he announced that he would be going to Lebanon to help in whatever way he can defending his country against the attack by Israeli forces. In response, Vlaams Belang leader Filip Dewinter called on the Belgian government to revoke Abou Jahjah's citizenship.

He wrote a book on the Israel-Lebanon war called "Diary Brussels Beirut".

Return to Lebanon
Since 2007 Abou Jahjah left Belgium and resettled in Lebanon and focused on his management career as a CEO of a small BPO company, Jana SARL in Saida. He later confirmed in 2009 on his Facebook wall that he was "glad to be out of that shit-hole now".

It was also in 2009 that he called on Facebook and in Arab language on his blog: "la valise ou le cercueil" and "And resist the occupier and colonizer constantly and without hesitation, and by all means necessary and available, and the most important thing, the armed struggle – until his expulsion from our land for good and unconditionally."

He continued visiting Europe regularly to speak at meetings and media shows. The VRT, the Belgian-Flemish state television, was even accused of sympathising with him and promoting him after it became known that the TV station paid his airplane ticket and hotel costs to attend the Belgian talk show Phara.  He is considered an authority on issues of immigration, and the Arab world. After the Arab spring, that Abou Jahjah supports adamantly, he gained intellectual credit in the West as someone who has always defended the opinion that revolution is inevitable in the Arab world. In 2008 a group of Flemish students videotaped an interview with him in which he was speaking in details about revolution in Egypt and elsewhere and expected it to happen within 5 years. Parts of the video were later shown on Belgian Television.  Three young students from Arab origin in Belgium wrote that Abou Jahjah and his AEL were a chance to build a better understanding between communities, and that chance was missed. Many argue today that it would have been much easier and more productive to dialogue with a person  like Abou Jahjah instead of the religious groups that appeared after he left Europe. This opinion has been outed by many people including former rivals, like former prime minister Verhofstadt, the man who decreed his arrest.

Popular culture
During the year of 2002 Abou Jahjah was the most mentioned name in the Belgian media, exceeding reference of the prime minister and the king. He became a household name in Belgium and in the Netherlands, and this was reflected in hundreds of caricatures and satires. He was played by the comedian  in the Dutch comedy show Kopspijkers.
The name "Abou Jahjah" also was used as a protest slogan by Antwerp dock workers during a strike in clashes with the Police. It was also sung by supporters of football club RSC Anderlecht in its clashes with rivals Royal Antwerp, as a tool to provoke the Antwerp supporters.

Debating skills

Abou Jahjah was called by Roderiek van Grieken of a Dutch debating institute a "perfect pure talent" in debating. Also as a solo speaker, Abou Jahjah drew very large crowds and could galvanize them to his causes. The renowned linguist Professor C. Delantsheer wrote a chapter on Abou Jahjah's rhetoric in a book published by Cambridge university in 2007. He had also presented a paper on the power of metaphors in the discourse of Abou Jahjah and presented it to an academical congress in Sweden.

Return to Belgium
In September 2013 Abou Jahjah returned to Belgium due to the dire security situation in Lebanon. He declared that for the time being he was choosing the security of his children over all other considerations. Upon his return, several opinion makers wrote articles welcoming him back. He declared that he will be founding a new movement that will seek to defend equal rights and social justice. From January 2014 he became a weekly columnist at the prestigious newspaper De Standaard. In January 2017 De Standaard stopped his column, when Jahjah declared on the January 2017 Jerusalem vehicular attack, the "liberation of Palestine 'by any means necessary' needs to take place" as calling for violence is not compatible with the policy of the newspaper.

Soon after he was chosen as the 4th most influential Belgian of foreign origin by Knack magazine, only preceded by then Belgian Prime Minister Elio Di Rupo, Meyrem Almaci and Vincent Kompany.

References

External links
 
 Dyab Abou Jahjah 
 
 
 
 
 
 

1971 births
Living people
Lebanese agnostics
Lebanese Shia Muslims
Lebanese Arab nationalists
Belgian activists
Belgian columnists
Minority rights activists
Debating
Belgian Shia Muslims
Lebanese emigrants to Belgium
Controversies in Belgium